Félix Castellanos Hernández (born 17 December 1961) is a Mexican politician from the Citizens' Movement. From 2006 to 2009 he served as Deputy of the LX Legislature of the Mexican Congress representing Guerrero.

References

1961 births
Living people
Politicians from Mexico City
Citizens' Movement (Mexico) politicians
21st-century Mexican politicians
Deputies of the LX Legislature of Mexico
Members of the Chamber of Deputies (Mexico) for Guerrero